Honey Creek Township may refer to one of the following places in the State of Illinois:

 Honey Creek Township, Adams County, Illinois
 Honey Creek Township, Crawford County, Illinois

See also

 Honey Point Township, Macoupin County, Illinois
 Honey Creek Township (disambiguation)

Illinois township disambiguation pages